The Tremblay river is a tributary of the rivière aux Anglais flowing in the unorganized territory Rivière-aux-Outardes, in the Manicouagan Regional County Municipality, in the administrative region of Côte-Nord, in the province of Quebec, in Canada.

The Tremblay river valley is mainly served by the English river path.

The surface of the Tremblay River is generally frozen from the beginning of December to the end of March, except the rapids areas; however, safe circulation on the ice is generally from mid-December to mid-March.

Geography 
The Tremblay River rises on the Canadian Shield, at Lac Alex. This eastern forest lake has two outlets: that of the north (at the bottom of a bay) turns out to be the beginning of a stream leading north to the Françoise River; that of the south (at the bottom of a bay) turns out to be the head of the Tremblay river.

  first east, then south, crossing Shaw Lake (length:  S-shaped;) over its full length to its mouth;
  first towards the southwest in the marsh area, crossing a small lake; then southeasterly in marsh areas, and crossing a small lake in mid-segment, to the outlet (coming from the east) of Tremblay lake;
  to the south first in the marsh area, then crossing an unidentified lake, until its mouth;
  first towards the south crossing Euclid Lake, where the current curve west after having skirted a peninsula, to its mouth located at the bottom of a bay in the southwest. Note: Lake Euclid looks like has four peninsulas which approach towards the center as if to form a misshapen star;
  north-west down the mountain, to its mouth.

The Tremblay River flows into a bend on the south bank of the intermediate course of the English River, in the unorganized territory of Rivière-aux-Outardes.

Toponym 
The term "Tremblay" is a family name of French origin.

The toponym "Tremblay River" was formalized on August 2, 1974, at the Place Names Bank of the Commission de toponymie du Québec.

See also 

 List of rivers of Quebec

References

External links 
 .

Rivers of Côte-Nord
Manicouagan Regional County Municipality